Stephen G. Smith is a United States Army major general who serves as commanding general of the 7th Infantry Division since May 11,  2021. He previously served as deputy commanding general of I Corps from July 2020 to May 2021, as well as commandant of the United States Army Field Artillery School from June 2018 to June 2020. Smith also commanded the 18th Field Artillery Brigade from June 2013 to June 2015.

A native of Atlanta, Georgia, Smith was commissioned as a second lieutenant from the ROTC program at The Citadel in 1991. He holds a master's degree from Mississippi State University, and is a graduate of the Field Artillery Basic and Advanced Courses, the United States Army Command and General Staff College, the Senior Service College, and the Joint and Combined Warfighting School.

References

Living people
Date of birth missing (living people)
Year of birth missing (living people)
People from Atlanta
Military personnel from Georgia (U.S. state)
The Citadel, The Military College of South Carolina alumni
Mississippi State University alumni
United States Army Command and General Staff College alumni
Joint Forces Staff College alumni
Recipients of the Defense Superior Service Medal
Recipients of the Legion of Merit
United States Army generals